"Go Go Go!" is a  single by UK independent grime artist Lethal Bizzle and House DJ Nick Bridges. It was released from the compilation album Best of Bizzle. It was released on 16 May 2010 as a Digital download. The song features vocals from Luciana.

Music video 
A music video to accompany the release of "Go Go Go!" was first released onto YouTube on 6 April 2010 at a total length of two minutes and forty-four seconds.

Track listing
Digital download - EP
 "Go Go Go!" (Radio Edit) - 2:43
 "Go Go Go!" (Club Mix) - 4:13
 "Go Go Go!" (Jacob Plant Mix) - 3:25
 "Go Go Go!" (feat. Luciana) [Music video] - 2:45

Charts

Release history

References 

2010 singles
Lethal Bizzle songs
2010 songs
Songs written by Nick Clow
Songs written by Luciana Caporaso
Songs written by Lethal Bizzle